Tucker Martine (born January 14, 1972) is an American record producer, musician and composer. In 2010, Paste Magazine included Martine in their list of the 10 Best Producers of the Decade.

Early life
Tucker Martine, the son of singer and songwriter Layng Martine Jr., grew up in Nashville, Tennessee where he played in bands and tinkered with recording devices before moving to Boulder, Colorado upon graduating from high school. In Colorado, Martine was a DJ at a public radio station KGNU. He would frequently play two or more records at once on the air. Martine also took courses at the Naropa Institute where he studied sound collage and befriended Harry Smith - the ethnomusicologist, artist and Kabbalist - who made a large impression on Martine.

Career
In 1993, Martine moved to Seattle, Washington where he began to combine his skills and interests. He joined Wayne Horvitz's chamber group The 4 Plus 1 Ensemble alongside Reggie Watts where Martine's instrument was a series of looping and sound manipulating devices which were fed by the groups otherwise acoustic instruments. Martine received a Grammy nomination in 2007 in the "best engineered album" category for the Floratone album with Bill Frisell on Blue Note. He has also released several albums of his field recordings. As a composer and musician Martine has released 2 albums under the recording pseudonym Mount Analog as well as Mylab (a collaboration with keyboardist Wayne Horvitz) and Orchestra Dim Bridges (with violist Eyvind Kang). Additionally, Microsoft called upon Martine's creativity when they asked him to help compose the startup and branding sounds for Microsoft's new operating system Windows Vista. Today Martine lives in Portland and continues to make records in his own studio Flora Recording & Playback.

Martine has worked with artists such as The Decemberists, R.E.M., My Morning Jacket, Modest Mouse, Beth Orton, Neko Case, First Aid Kit, Mudhoney, Madison Cunningham, Bill Frisell, Sufjan Stevens, Spoon, Grandaddy, Mavis Staples, Courtney Barnett, Iron And Wine, Gary Larson, The Jayhawks, Karl Blau, Edward Sharpe And The Magnetic Zeros, Carrie Brownstein, Blind Pilot, Camera Obscura, Robin Pecknold (Fleet Foxes), Stephen Malkmus (Pavement), k.d. lang, She and Him, M. Ward, Mt. Joy, Case/lang/veirs, Jesse Sykes, Raye Zaragoza, Warpaint (band) and Laura Veirs.

Discography

As Tucker Martine
Eat the Dream: Moroccan Reveries (1994)
Bush Taxi Mali (1998)
Orchestra Dim Bridges with Eyvind Kang (2004)
Broken Hearted Dragonflies: Insect Electronica from Southeast Asia (2005)
"Fireworks - First Aid Kit" (2017)

With Floratone
Floratone (2007)
Floratone II 2012

With Wayne Horvitz
4+1 Ensemble (Intuition, 1996 [1998])
From a Window (Avant, 2000)
Mylab (2004)

As Mount Analog
Mount Analog (1997)
New Skin (2004)

Selected discography

References

External links
Tucker Martine | Credits All Music Guide entry for Tucker
NPR Tucker Martine Guest DJ Guest DJ Tucker Martine
Management Contact
Feature on Martine in HARP magazine

1972 births
Living people
Record producers from Oregon
Place of birth missing (living people)
Musicians from Portland, Oregon
20th-century American musicians
21st-century American musicians